Misha Jonas Emanuel Latuhihin (born 26 December 1970 in Nijmegen, Gelderland) is a retired volleyball player from the Netherlands, who represented his native country at the 1996 Summer Olympics in Atlanta, Georgia under the guidance of coach Joop Alberda. There he was the stand-in for Peter Blangé in the Dutch National Volleyball Team that won the gold medal by defeating rivals Italy in the final (3-2).

References
  Dutch Olympic Committee

1970 births
Living people
Dutch men's volleyball players
Dutch people of Indonesian descent
Volleyball players at the 1996 Summer Olympics
Olympic volleyball players of the Netherlands
Olympic gold medalists for the Netherlands
Sportspeople from Nijmegen
Olympic medalists in volleyball
Medalists at the 1996 Summer Olympics